The Wonder Books are a series of books produced in the 1930s and 1940s.  It was published by the University of Knowledge Incorporated, editor in chief being Glenn Frank. It is not to be confused with the children's book imprint of Grosset and Dunlap.

List of Wonder Books (There are 24 volumes)
 The Earth Before Man - The story of how things began 
 The Story of Man - His earliest appearance and development to the portals of history 
 The Dawn of Civilization - And life in the ancient East 
 Selected Readings -from much loved books 
 The Glories of Ancient History 
 History From The Renaissance to Napoleon 
 The Outline of Modern History 
 Outline History of World Literature 
 The World we live in and The people we live with travel 
 The World we live in & The People we live with - still more travel 
 The World we live in & The People we live with - still more travel (Marvels of Asia and the Orient) 
 Great Leaders -Men and women who influenced their times 
 Great Inventors and Their Inventions 
 The Story of Engineering 
 Wonders of Modern Industry - The story of the machine age 
 Music and the Great Composers - The story of musical expression 
 Trailing Animals Around The World 
 Earth and Sky - Wonders of the universe 
 Exploring The Mysteries of Physics and Chemistry 
 The Story of Living Plants, Their Uses and how they grow 
 An Outline History of Art - The Key to Parnassus 
 An Outline History of Art - Art of the Middle Ages in Europe of Islam, in the Far East, and of the American Indians 
 An Outline History of Art - Art of the European Renaissance, Baroque, and Modern Art 
 A Modern Book of Wonders - Amazing Facts in a remarkable world

References 

Series of books
20th-century books